BHK Bhalla@Halla.Kom is a 2016 Indian Hindi-language comedy film directed by Rakesh Chaturvedi Om, featuring songs by Rahul Mishra. The film released on 5 February 2016 and stars Ujjwal Rana and Inshika Bedi in the lead roles.

Of the film, Chaturvedi has commented that he drew upon his own life experiences for inspiration for the movie, as he had several of his marriage proposals rejected because he did not own his own home.

Synopsis 
All Pawan Bhalla wants is to marry his love Pooja, however her father has given him one requirement: that he get a place of his own and do so within a month. Finding a suitable home proves to be difficult, as living space in Mumbai is at a premium.

Cast 
 Ujjwal Rana as Pawan Bhalla
 Inshika Bedi as Pooja
 Raj Arjun as Gagan Bhalla

Soundtrack and background score

Music and lyrics for the film were composed by Rahul Mishra. 
 Aa Jaa Mahi Ve - Pavni Pandey
 Phalooda - Neeraj Joshi, Tochi Raina
 Soniye (Remix) - Rahul Mishra, Shivangi Bhayana
 Soniye - Revisited (Unplugged) - Rahul Mishra, Shivangi Bhayana

Reception 
The Times of India panned the film, as they felt that it was "far too content being plain and passable. Replete with amateur jokes, the writing is worse than that of laughter shows." The Free Press Journal also criticized BHK Bhalla@Halla.com, writing that it was "A threadbare situational comedy that tries hard to make it all look funny but fails miserably."

In contrast, actor Tom Alter praised the movie, which he felt was comparable to Jaane Bhi Do Yaaro. The Hans India was also more favorable, as they wrote that the movie "largely succeeds in narrating a good story in a light-hearted and funny manner."

References

External links
 

2016 films
2010s Hindi-language films